State Route 595 (SR 595) is a north–south state highway in southeastern Ohio, a U.S. state. Its northern terminus is at a T-intersection with SR 216 in New Straitsville, just two blocks southeast of SR 216's northern terminus at SR 93.

Route description
The state highway travels through the counties of Hocking and Perry along its way. No part of SR 595 is incorporated in the National Highway System.

History
SR 595 was created in 1937 along the routing that it maintains to this day through eastern Hocking County and extreme southern Perry County. The highway has not experienced any major changes to alignment since it was established.

Major intersections

References

External links

595
Transportation in Hocking County, Ohio
Transportation in Perry County, Ohio